Capital Health can refer to several different things:

Canada

 Capital District Health Authority, a health authority located in Nova Scotia
 Capital Health, a former health authority located in Alberta, replaced by Alberta Health Services

United States

 Capital Health System, a non-profit health system in New Jersey
 Capital Health Plan, a Tallahassee-based BCBS-affiliated non-profit HMO which provides medical and health insurance services in the Big Bend region of Florida.